Round Harbour was a small settlement located southeast of Baie Verte, Newfoundland and Labrador. The community was entirely resettled in 2016.

See also
Baie Verte Peninsula
List of designated places in Newfoundland and Labrador
Resettlement (Newfoundland)

References

Populated coastal places in Canada
Populated places in Newfoundland and Labrador